Tetragona quadrangula, also called borá-de-chão ("ground borá" bee) in Brazil, is a species of eusocial stingless bee in the family Apidae and tribe Meliponini. It is endemic to Brazil.

References 

Meliponini
Hymenoptera of South America
Hymenoptera of Brazil
Endemic fauna of Brazil